Friedel Pia Lindström (born 20 September 1938) is a Swedish television journalist, and the first child of actress Ingrid Bergman.

Life and career 
Lindström is the only child born to Ingrid Bergman and her first husband, Swedish neurosurgeon Petter Lindström. She was greatly affected when her mother left her father for Italian director Roberto Rossellini. Petter Lindström sued for desertion and waged a custody battle with Bergman for their daughter, and Pia did not reunite with her mother until 1957. Her half-brother, Roberto Ingmar Rossellini, was born on 7 February 1950, and her mother married Roberto Rossellini on 24 May 1950. On 18 June 1952, Lindström's twin half-sisters Isabella Rossellini and Isotta Rossellini were born.

Lindström began her broadcasting career as a reporter at KGO-TV in San Francisco in 1966 and in 1971 went to WCBS-TV in New York City.

From 1973 to 1997, she was a news anchorwoman and also a theater and arts critic for WNBC-TV in New York City, and made television appearances and did some acting (in mostly Italian films) before she became a news correspondent. Her Italian films include Marriage Italian Style (1964), The Possessed (1965) and The Queens (1966). She received two Emmy Awards for news coverage and on-screen performance, as well as the Associated Press Broadcaster's Award. She is now retired.

Personal life
Married three times, Lindström has two sons, Justin and Nicholas Daly, from her second marriage, to Joseph Daly. They married on December 28, 1971. She is currently married to attorney Jack H. Carley.

References

External links

American Theatre Wing Biography

1938 births
Living people
Television anchors from New York City
Television anchors from San Francisco
American people of German descent
American women television journalists
Swedish emigrants to the United States
Swedish people of German descent
Swedish film actresses
American sports announcers
American horse racing announcers
Women sports announcers
21st-century American women